Roberto Balzani (born 21 August 1961 in Forlì) is an Italian historian, professor and politician.

He is professor of contemporary history at the University of Bologna. His works mainly focus on the Italian Risorgimento and history of Italy in the 19th century.

Balzani is a member of the Democratic Party and served as Mayor of Forlì from June 2009 to May 2014.

See also
2009 Italian local elections
List of mayors of Forlì

References

External links
 

1961 births
Living people
Mayors of Forlì
Democratic Party (Italy) politicians